Rome, Open City (also released as Open City) is a 1945 Italian neorealist war drama film directed by Roberto Rossellini and co-written by Sergio Amidei, Celeste Negarville and Federico Fellini. Set in Rome in 1944, the film follows a diverse group of characters coping under the Nazi occupation, and centers on a Resistance fighter trying to escape the city with the help of a Catholic priest. The title refers to Rome being declared an open city after 14 August 1943. It forms the first third of Rosselini's "Neorealist Trilogy", followed by Paisan (1946) and Germany, Year Zero (1948).

Open City is considered one of the most important and representative works of Italian neorealism, and an important stepping stone for Italian filmmaking as a whole. It was one of the first post-war Italian pictures to gain major acclaim and accolades internationally, winning the prestigious Palme d'Or at the 1946 Cannes Film Festival and being nominated for Best Adapted Screenplay Oscar at the 19th Academy Awards. It launched director Rosselini, screenwriter Fellini, and actress Anna Magnani into the international spotlight.

In 2008, the film was included on the Italian Ministry of Cultural Heritage’s 100 films to be saved, a list of 100 films that "have changed the collective memory of the country between 1942 and 1978."

Plot
In occupied Rome in 1944,  German SS troops are trying to arrest Giorgio Manfredi, an engineer, communist, and leader of the Resistance against the Nazis and Italian Fascists. The landlady of his rooming house warns him in time for him to elude capture. He sneaks to the home of Francesco, another Resistance fighter. There he encounters Pina, Francesco's visibly pregnant fiancée, who lives in the next apartment. She first suspects Giorgio of being a cop and gives him a rough time, but when he makes it clear he is a confederate of Francesco she welcomes him into his apartment to wait for him. With Pina's help Giorgio contacts Don Pietro, a Catholic priest who is helping the Resistance.  Giorgio asks him to transfer messages and money to a group of Resistance fighters outside the city, as he is now known to the Gestapo and cannot do it himself.  The priest willingly does so.

Don Pietro is also scheduled to officiate at Pina's and Francesco's wedding the next day. Francesco is not very religious, but would rather be married by a patriot priest than a fascist official; the devout Pina, on the other hand, is pragmatic about the decision - as it would be unthinkable in normal times for an unmarried pregnant woman to be married in a church - but wrestling with why God would allow such terrible things to happen to people as are occurring all around them. Her son, Marcello, a somewhat reluctant altar boy, is involved with a crippled youth fighting his own resistance planting bombs. Pina's feckless sister Laura stays with her, but works in a cabaret serving the Nazis and Fascists. She is also an old friend of Marina, Giorgio's girlfriend, who has been looking for him. Marina also works in the cabaret and has not only turned to prostitution for the luxuries she craves but has become addicted to drugs by the treacherous Ingrid, a consort of the local Nazi commander, Major Bergmann.

Bergmann, helped by the Italian police chief, suspects that Giorgio is at Francesco's apartment. They raid the huge building that afternoon, pulling everyone out and arresting dozens of men. Giorgio gets away, but Francesco is thrown in a truck to be hauled off. Seeing him, Pina breaks through a cordon of soldiers screaming his name, but is shot dead. The priest, who was in the building to erase any trace of the Resistance under the guise of praying for a dying man, holds her in his arms and prays as Part I ends.

Part II begins with the several trucks of Italian prisoners taken from the apartment building in a convoy with military vehicles, which is attacked by Resistance fighters.  Most of the captives appear to escape. Francesco reconnects with Giorgio. Together they go to the priest, who has offered to hide them in a monastery.

Afterwards the pair go to an inn where Marina lives and works to spend the night in hiding.  When Giorgio sees how she lives and finds her drugs they quarrel over her choices.  Seeking revenge for his rebuke, she betrays both him and Francesco to the Nazis.  The next morning Giorgio, Francesco, Don Pietro, and an Austrian deserter the priest is also aiding, leave for the monastery.  Francesco lags slightly behind, and is able to escape when the rest of the party is ambushed by Germans, who mistakenly believe the Austrian is him.  Marina is rewarded by Ingrid with a fur coat and more drugs.

At Nazi headquarters Bergmann tells Ingrid of his plan - to extract everything from his captives before dawn in order to take the Resistance by surprise before news of their capture can get back to it.  He then offers leniency to Giorgio in return for betrayal.  Giorgio refuses and is taken off to be tortured.  The Austrian, who has already displayed cowardice at the prospect of interrogation, hangs himself in his cell. The Gestapo assault Giorgio in waves with whips and a blow torch, in vain.

Stressing at the deadline he has set himself, Bergmann next tries to convince Don Pietro to use his influence on Giorgio to betray his cause, saying that he is an atheist and communist who is an enemy of the Church.  Don Pietro placidly responds that anyone who strives to live a righteous life is doing God's work. Bergmann then forces Don Pietro to watch Giorgio's torture. When Giorgio dies without revealing anything, Don Pietro blesses his body and commends him to God's mercy. Giorgio's refusal to yield shakes the confidence of the Germans, including Bergmann, who had boasted that they were the "master race", and no one from a "slave race" could withstand their torture.

Marina and a German officer who had bad-mouthed the Reich to Bergmann earlier in the officers' club stumble into the scene drunk.  When she sees that Giorgio has refused Bergmann's deal and allowed himself to be tortured to death, she faints.
The Gestapo chief and Ingrid decide that she is now useless to them and order her locked up.  Ingrid removes the coat Marina had draped over her shoulders, saying she'll use it again on the "next one".

In the morning Don Pietro is taken to be executed. The parish altar boys/resistance fighters show up and begin whistling their signal tune to him. Effectively sightless since his glasses were broken being thrown roughly into a cell upon arrival at Nazi headquarters, Don Pietro is heartened when he recognizes the boys' tribute.  An Italian firing squad readies to shoot, but most aim slightly off, unwilling to kill a priest.  They fire.  Seeing the merely wounded Don Pietro still mumbling prayers the presiding German officer, the same man who had decried the futility of the Nazi obsession with world dominance the night before to Major Bergmann, draws his pistol and puts the priest to a merciful end, muttering disdainfully over his involvement as part of the "Master Race".

The boys bow their heads in grief then slowly depart, the city of Rome and St. Peter's Basilica visible clearly in the background.

Cast

Development
By the end of World War II, Rossellini had abandoned the film Desiderio, as conditions made it impossible to complete (though it was later finished by Marcello Pagliero in 1946 and disowned by Rossellini). By 1944, there was virtually no film industry in Italy, and the origins of the film's initial funding are unclear. Rossellini had initially planned a documentary titled Storie di ieri on the subject of Don Pieto Morosini, a Catholic priest who had been shot by the Nazis for helping the partisan movement in Italy, and began meeting with a number of screenwriters in Rome shortly after Germany abandoned the city. Federico Fellini was initially uninterested in joining, as he had disapproved of partisan action during the occupation.

Production 

The Nazis abandoned Rome on June 4, 1944; the Allies occupied the undefended city the next day.  Shooting for the film began in January 1945 under precarious conditions, with its style developing from circumstance. The facilities at Cinecittà Studios were unavailable at the time, as they had been damaged in the war and were then currently requisitioned by Allied forces to house displaced persons.

Aldo Venturini, a wool merchant with some capital to invest, was involved in financing the film. After a few days of shooting production had stopped due to lack of cash, and Rossellini convinced Venturini to complete the film as a producer, arguing that it was the only way to safeguard his investment.

New Yorker Rod E. Geiger, a soldier in the Signal Corps who eventually became instrumental in the movie's global success, met Rosselini at a point when the production was out of film. Geiger had access to film - short-ends and complete rolls that might have become fogged, scratched, or otherwise deemed unfit for use - that the Signal Corps regularly threw away.  He provided enough of this stock for the picture to be completed.

In order to authentically portray the hardships and poverty of life in Rome under the occupation Rossellini hired mostly non-professional actors; a few exceptions included established stars Fabrizi and Anna Magnani. According to Rossellini, "the situation of the moment guided by my own and the actors' moods and perspectives" dictated what was shot, and he relied more on improvisation than on a script. He also stated that the work was "a film about fear, the fear felt by all of us but by me in particular. I too had to go into hiding. I too was on the run. I had friends who were captured and killed." Rossellini relied on traditional devices of melodrama, such as identification of the film's central characters and a clear distinction between the primary good and evil ones. Only four interior sets were constructed for the more important locations of the film. Production ended in June 1945.

The film's documentary or newsreel style reflects in part different film stocks used in its production. When the Cineteca Nazionale restored the print in 1995 it stated that the original negative consisted of just three different types: Ferrania C6 for outdoor scenes, and the more sensitive Agfa Super Pan and Agfa Ultra Rapid for interiors. The previously unexplained changes in image brightness and consistency are now attributed to inadequate processing, including variable development times, insufficient agitation in the developing bath, and insufficient fixing.

Unlike films made in the early years of the war (when Italy was Germany's ally under Mussolini) that depicted the British, Americans, Greeks, Russians and other allied countries, as well as Ethiopians, communists, and partisans, as antagonists, Rome, Open City was one of the early Italian films of the war to depict the struggle as being against the Germans and Italian fascists. Even though the Allied Invasion of Italy took place in 1943, there is no trace of any Allied presence or imminent arrival in the movie; instead, references are made to it being only "the beginning" of what was characterized as a long struggle ahead, not a Nazi evacuation of Rome that had already occurred.

Distribution 
The film opened in Italy on 27 September 1945, with the war damage to Rome not yet repaired. The United States premiere followed on 25 February 1946 in New York. The American release was censored, resulting in a cut of about 15 minutes. The story of the film's journey from Italy to the United States is recounted in Federico Fellini's autobiographical essay "Sweet Beginnings" published in 1996. Rod E. Geiger, a U.S. Army private stationed in Rome, met Rossellini and Fellini after catching them tapping into the power supply used to illuminate the G.I. dancehall. In the book The Adventures of Roberto Rossellini, author Tag Gallagher credits Geiger at age 29 as the "man who more than any single individual was to make him and the new Italian cinema famous around the world." Before the war, Geiger had worked for an American distributor and exhibitor of foreign films which helped facilitate the film's release in the United States. In gratitude, Rossellini gave Geiger a co-producer credit.

However, According to Fellini's essay Geiger was "a 'half-drunk' soldier who stumbled (literally as well as figuratively) onto the set of Open City. [He] misrepresented himself as an American producer when actually he 'was a nobody and didn't have a dime.'" Fellini's account of Geiger's involvement in the film was the subject of an unsuccessful 1983 defamation lawsuit Geiger brought against Fellini.

The film was banned in several countries. West Germany banned it from 1951 to 1960. In Argentina, it was inexplicably withdrawn in 1947 following an anonymous government order.

Critical response
Rome, Open City received a mediocre reception from Italian audiences when it was first released when Italian people were said to want escapism after the war. However, it became more popular as the film's reputation grew in other countries. The film brought international attention to Italian cinema and is considered a quintessential example of neorealism in film, so much so that together with Paisà and Germania anno zero it is called Rossellini's "Neorealist Trilogy". Robert Burgoyne called it "the perfect exemplar of this mode of cinematic creation [neorealism] whose established critical definition was given by André Bazin".  Rossellini himself traced what was called neorealism back to one of his earlier films The White Ship, which he claimed had the same style. Some Italian critics also maintained that neorealism was simply a continuation of earlier Italian films from the 1930s, such as those directed by filmmakers Francesco De Robertis and Alessandro Blasetti. More recent scholarship points out that this film is actually less neo-realist and rather melodramatic. Critics debate whether the pending marriage of the Catholic Pina and the communist Francesco really "acknowledges the working partnership of communists and Catholics in the actual historical resistance".

Bosley Crowther, film critic for The New York Times, gave the film a highly positive review, and wrote "Yet the total effect of the picture is a sense of real experience, achieved as much by the performance as by the writing and direction. The outstanding performance is that of Aldo Fabrizi as the priest, who embraces with dignity and humanity a most demanding part. Marcello Pagliero is excellent too, as the resistance leader, and Anna Magnani brings humility and sincerity to the role of the woman who is killed. The remaining cast is unqualifiedly fine, with the exception of Harry Feist in the role of the German commander. His elegant arrogance is a bit too vicious – but that may be easily understood." Film critic William Wolf especially praised the scene where Pina is shot, stating that "few scenes in cinema have the force of that in which Magnani, arms outstretched, races towards the camera to her death."

Pope Francis has said that the film is among his favorites.

On Rotten Tomatoes, the film has a rare approval rating of 100% based on 42 reviews, with an average rating of 9.08/10. The site's critics' consensus reads: "Open City fills in the familiar contours of its storyline with three-dimensional characters and a narrative depth that add up to a towering – and still powerfully resonant – cinematic achievement."

Other media
The difficulties encountered by the director and crew before and during the shooting of "Rome, Open City" are dramatized in the 1996 film Celluloide by Carlo Lizzani and in it Massimo Ghini plays the role of Rossellini. In 2004, The Children of Rome, open city was also released, a documentary directed by Laura Muscardin.

Accolades

Academy Award

National Board of Review Award

New York Film Critics Circle Award

Nastros d'Argento

Film festivals

See also 

 List of films with a 100% rating on Rotten Tomatoes, a review aggregator website

References

Further reading
 David Forgacs. Roma città aperta. London: British Film Institute, 2000.
Stefano Roncoroni, La storia di Roma città aperta, Bologna-Recco, Cineteca di Bologna-Le Mani, 2006, .

External links

 
 
Rome Open City: A Star Is Born an essay by Irene Bignardi at the Criterion Collection

1945 films
1940s war films
Italian war films
Roma, Citta Aperta
1940s German-language films
Films about anti-fascism
Films about deserters
Italian black-and-white films
Films about fascists
Films about Catholicism
Films about Italian resistance movement
Films directed by Roberto Rossellini
Films set in Rome
1940s independent films
Italian Campaign of World War II films
Italian neorealist films
Films about Nazis
Palme d'Or winners
Films with screenplays by Federico Fellini
1940s political films
Minerva Film films
Films scored by Renzo Rossellini
Italian docudrama films
Italian multilingual films
Italian World War II films
1940s multilingual films
1940s Italian films